The  is a DC electric multiple unit (EMU) train type operated by West Japan Railway Company (JR-West) on suburban services in the "Keihanshin" Kyoto-Osaka-Kobe area since December 2010.

Design
226 vehicles were ordered, at a cost of approximately 30 billion yen. The trains incorporate increased front-end crash protection with the inclusion of crushable zones.

Variants
 225-0 series
 225-100 series
 225-700 series
 225-5000 series
 225-5100 series
 225-6000 series

Livery for each is identical to that of the 223 series vehicles on each of these routes.

The first 225-100 series second-batch sets were delivered in early 2016, formed as four- and eight-car units. These were followed by 225-5100 series second-batch sets, also delivered in early 2016, formed as four- and six-car sets.

Operations

225-0/100 series
 Tokaido Main Line (Biwako Line, JR Kyoto Line, JR Kobe Line) ( – )
 Sanyo Main Line (JR Kobe Line) (Kōbe – )
 Hokuriku Main Line (Biwako Line) ( – Maibara)
 Kosei Line (through services from Hokuriku Main Line)
 Kusatsu Line
 Akō Line ( – )

225-700 series (4 cars) 

 Tokaido Main Line (Biwako Line, JR Kyoto Line, JR Kobe Line) (Yasu – Kobe)
 Sanyo Main Line (JR Kobe Line) (Aboshi – Kobe)

225-5000/5100 series (4 cars)
 Osaka Loop Line
 Hanwa Line (through services from Kansai Airport Line)
 Kansai Airport Line
 Kisei Main Line (Kinokuni Line) ( – )

225-5100 series (6 cars)
 Hanwa Line

225-6000 series
 Tokaido Main Line (JR Kobe Line) ( – )
 Fukuchiyama Line (JR Takarazuka Line) (Amagasaki –  or )

Formations

225-0 series
The 225-0 series sets are formed as eight-car, six-car, and four-car sets, as follows.

8-car sets

6-car sets

4-car sets

225-100 series

The 225-100 series sets are formed as eight-car and four-car sets, as follows.

8-car sets

4-car sets

225-700 series 
The 225-700 series sets are formed as four-car sets, as follows.

225-5000 series
The 225-5000 series sets are formed as follows.

225-5100 series
The 225-5100 series sets are formed as six-car and four-car sets, as follows.

6-car sets

4-car sets

225-6000 series
The 225-6000 series sets are formed as six-car and four-car sets, as follows.

6-car sets

4-car sets

Interior

History
The first 225-0 series 8-car train was delivered from Kinki Sharyo on 18 May 2010. The first pair of 225-5000 series 4-car trains was delivered from Kinki Sharyo on 7 September 2010.

Both the 225-0 and 225-5000 series entered revenue service from 1 December 2010.

The unvelling of a new 225-700 series set took place on 18 January 2023. Intended for expansion of the current "A-Seat" paid reserved seating program rolled out on 225-1000 series sets, the new 4-car sets feature an end car which is equipped with Wi-Fi, 2 + 2 abreast seating, a washroom, and two single sliding doors per side (differing from the "A-Seat" cars on the 225-1000 series trainsets which feature three pairs of doors per side). The sets are expected to begin revenue service on the 18 March 2023 timetable revision when the "A-Seat" program is expanded on special rapid services on the Tokaido and San'yo main lines. As of 30 January 2023, two sets have been delivered and have since been undergoing testing and driver training.

References

External links

 JR-West CEO's September 2009 report announcing 225 series order 
 JR-West news release announcing completion of first set (18 May 2010) 
 Kinki Sharyo 225 series information 

Electric multiple units of Japan
West Japan Railway Company
Train-related introductions in 2010
Kawasaki multiple units
Kinki Sharyo multiple units
1500 V DC multiple units of Japan